The Men's Room is a British television drama mini-series that was produced by the BBC and originally aired on BBC2 from 25 September to 23 October 1991. The series, which comprises five 50-minute episodes, was adapted by Laura Lamson from Ann Oakley's 1989 novel of the same name, and stars Bill Nighy, Harriet Walter, Amanda Redman, Charlotte Cornwell and James Aubrey.

A black comedy and period piece set during the Thatcher years, it tells the story of an affair between two academics: a previously devoted wife and mother, Charity Walton (Walter), and a serial womanizer, Mark Carleton (Nighy).

Nighy credits the series as being his breakthrough role.

Cast
 Bill Nighy as Prof. Mark Carleton
 Harriet Walter as Charity Walton
 Patrick Drury as James Walton
 Mel Martin as Jane Carleton
 Amanda Redman as Sally
 Charlotte Cornwell as Margaret Lacey
 James Aubrey as Steve Kirkwood
 Bill Stewart as Doctor Ivan Swinhoe
 Cheryl Hall as Mavis McDonald
 David Ryall as Alan Pascoe
 Kate Hardie as Tessa Pascoe
 Tilly Vosburgh as Delia
 Philip Croskin as Mack MacKinnon

Home media release
The series was released on DVD in 2013.

References

External links

BBC television dramas
1991 British television series debuts
1991 British television series endings
1990s British drama television series
British black comedy television shows
1990s British television miniseries
Television shows based on British novels
English-language television shows